Shocking Shades of Claw Boys Claw is the debut studio album (released on 12" vinyl) by Dutch rock and roll band Claw Boys Claw. The album was released on their own label, Hipcat Records. Claw Boys Claw had been founded in 1983 by drummer Allard Jolles, who played guitar and sang in L'Attentat, another band from the "Amsterdam Guitar School". They won a talent show in November 1983 and, with that money, paid for three hours' of studio time; the result was their debut album. Released in May 1984, the album proved popular despite (or perhaps in spite of) the low-fi sound quality, and the band became quite a hit on the Dutch club circuit, thanks in no small part to their energetic stage presence. After the album was released, Jolles returned to L'Attentat, though he would sporadically work with Claw Boys Claw, producing Hitkillers/The Beast Of Claw Boys Claw, for instance.

When the band signed with Polydor in 1986, the album was re-released, again only on 12" vinyl. Following the band's return to the studio and the stage in 2008, Shocking Shades of Claw Boys Claw was re-released in 2008 by Play It Again Sam. The CD had five additional tracks: "So Mean" and "Love Like Seas" had been released as a 7" single in 1985; "Indian Wallpaper," "Dirty Dog," and "Foul Play" had been released as a 12" single in 1985.

Track listing

Tracks 13-17 only found on 2008 reissue.

Personnel
John Cameron - guitar
Pete TeBos - vocals
Bobbie Rossini - bass
Allard Jolles - drums

References

See also
Claw Boys Claw discography

1984 debut albums
Claw Boys Claw albums
Polydor Records albums